The men's team sabre was a fencing event held as part of the Fencing at the 1912 Summer Olympics programme. It was the second appearance of the event, which had been introduced in 1908.

Rosters

Austria
 Richard Verderber
 Otto Herschmann
 Rudolf Cvetko
 Andreas Suttner
 Friedrich Golling
 Albert Bógathy
 Reinhold Trampler

Belgium
 Henri Anspach
 Léon Tom
 Marcel Berré
 Philippe Le Hardy de Beaulieu
 Robert Hennet

Bohemia
 Josef Pfeiffer
 Vilém Goppold z Lobsdorfu, Sr.
 Bedřich Schejbal
 Josef Čipera
 Otakar Švorčík

Denmark
 Jens Berthelsen
 Ejnar Levison
 Hans Olsen
 Ivan Osiier
 Lauritz Christian Østrup

Great Britain
 Archie Corble
 Edward Brookfield
 Alfred Ridley-Martin
 Harry Butterworth
 Richard Crawshay
 William Marsh

Germany
 Friedrich Schwarz
 Fritz Jack
 Johann Adam
 Georg Stöhr
 Walther Meienreis
 Hermann Plaskuda
 Jakob Erckrath de Bary
 Emil Schön
 Julius Lichtenfels

Hungary
 Jenő Fuchs
 Zoltán Schenker
 László Berti
 Ervin Mészáros
 Péter Tóth
 Lajos Werkner
 Oszkár Gerde
 Dezső Földes

Italy
 Edoardo Alaimo
 Giovanni Benfratello
 Fernando Cavallini
 Nedo Nadi
 Ugo Di Nola
 Gino Belloni

Netherlands
 Jetze Doorman
 Dirk Scalongne
 Adrianus de Jong
 Willem Hubert van Blijenburgh
 Hendrik de Iongh
 George van Rossem

Russia
 Vladimir Andreyev
 Aleksandr Shkylev
 Vladimir Danich
 Apollon Guiber von Greifenfels
 Nikolay Kuznetsov
 Aleksandr Mordovin
 Georgy Zakyrich
 Anatoly Timofeyev

Sweden
 Axel Jöhncke
 Helge Werner
 Birger Personne
 Carl-Gustaf Klerck

Results

Quarterfinals

Semifinals

Final

References

 
 

Fencing at the 1912 Summer Olympics